Sandiacre Town Cricket Club is an amateur cricket club based in Sandiacre, Derbyshire, England. The club was established in 1877 and has won the ECB National Club Cricket Championship on 2 occasions: 2003 and 2014. The club currently play in the Derbyshire Premier Cricket League being Champions in 2002, 2004, 2012, 2015, 2017 and 2021.

Ground
The club has played at Longmoor Lane, Sandiacre, since around 1890. The current pavilion was built in 2002 with the aid of a National Lottery grant. The 1st and 2nd XI teams use the Longmoor Lane pitch, rated by the DCCL as a Grade A+ ground, and the 3rd XI and Junior teams use Breaston CC's old ground, located south of Risley, Derbyshire, which is rated as a Grade B ground.

History
History of cricket in Sandiacre dates back to the early nineteenth century, where a match report was recorded between Sandiacre and Stapleford in the Nottingham Review on the 4th November 1814, which Sandiacre won. It's uncertain as to where the original home ground was, but the earliest clue was published in the Nottingham Review in 1838 stating that the ground was in a field near the Plough Inn. Sometime between 1877 - 1900, the club moved to rented farmland on Longmoor Lane. By 1921, the earliest reference to 'Sandiacre Town' appeared, possibly to help differentiate the club from neighbouring rivals using Sandiacre in their team names. After raising money from collecting door to door throughout Sandiacre and with help from the National Playing Field's Association, the club managed to buy the Ground on Longmoor Lane in 1956, three years after joining the Nott's Amateur League. After a century of eventful cricketing memories, the old pavilion was eventually replaced by the current pavilion in 2002, which was formally opened by Ian Botham and Ravi Bopara in 2003.

The Club currently has 3 senior teams competing in the Derbyshire County Cricket League, a Sunday league team in the Newark Club Cricket Alliance league and a long established and very successful junior training section that play competitive cricket in the Erewash Young Cricketers League.

Club Performance
The Derbyshire County Cricket League competition results showing the club's positions in the league (by Division) since 2001.

The Newark Club Cricket Alliance Sunday League competition results showing the club's position (by Division) since 2011.

Club Honours

See also
Club cricket

References

Further reading 
 Breakwell, Keith. 1994 "The History of Cricket in Long Eaton, Sandiacre & Sawley" 978-0-9521-4371-0
 Dunn, Peter. "Sandiacre Town Cricket Club, 1877-1977"

External links
 Official Club website
 The Club Play-Cricket website
 Derbyshire Cricket Foundation YouTube
 Derbyshire County Cricket League Official Play-Cricket website
 ECB National Club Cricket Championship

English club cricket teams
Cricket in Derbyshire
1877 establishments in England
Club cricket